Nandewar County is one of the 141 Cadastral divisions of New South Wales. It is located to the east of the Namoi River, with Narrabri at the north-west edge, and Gunnedah at the southern edge.

Nandewar County is named after the range of mountains called Nandewar by the local Aboriginals.

Parishes 
A full list of parishes found within this county; their current LGA and mapping coordinates to the approximate centre of each location is as follows:

References

Counties of New South Wales